Leicester Tigers (officially Leicester Football Club) are a professional rugby union club based in Leicester, England. They play in Premiership Rugby, England's top division of rugby.

The club was founded in 1880 and since 1892 plays its home matches at Mattioli Woods Welford Road in the south of the city. The club has been known by the nickname Tigers since at least 1885. In the 2021–22 Premiership Rugby season Tigers finished 1st, this entitled them to compete in the 2021–22 European Rugby Champions Cup, and went on to win the Play off final to be champions.  The current head coach is Richard Wigglesworth, who was appointed as interim head coach in December 2022.

Leicester have won 21 major titles. They were European Champions twice, back-to-back in 2001 and 2002; have won a record 11 English Championships, five RFU Knockout Cups and three Anglo-Welsh Cups, most recently in 2017.  Leicester last won the Premiership Rugby title in the 2022 season, and appeared in a record nine successive Premiership finals, from 2005 to 2013.  Leicester is one of only three teams never to have been relegated from the top division.  Leicester have appeared in five European finals, the joint-second most overall, as well as the two victories they have also lost finals three times, in 1997, 2007 and 2009. In 2021 they played in the European Rugby Challenge Cup final.

Five Leicester Tigers players were members of the 2003 Rugby World Cup Final winning  side including captain Martin Johnson.

History

Foundation and Tom Crumbie era (1880–1928)

Leicester Football Club was formed on 3 August 1880 by the merger of three smaller teams: Leicester Athletic Society, Leicester Amateurs and Leicester Alert. The club's first game was a scoreless draw on 23 October against Moseley at the Belgrave Road Cycle and Cricket Ground. On 10 September 1892 Leicester played their first game at Welford Road against a Leicestershire XV.  Tom Crumbie was appointed secretary on 2 August 1895, a position he held for the next 33 years.  Crumbie has been credited with dragging the club to national prominence. He disbanded reserve and third teams making the First XV an invitation side and introducing players from all over the country.  Tigers first silverware was the Midlands Counties Cup won for the first time in 1898 against Moseley. Having won the Midlands Counties Cup every year from 1898 to 1905, they dropped out "to give other teams a chance".  On their return to the competition in 1909 Tigers won the cup again. In 1903 Jack Miles became the first home-produced England international.  Leicester's status as a premier club was confirmed in 1905 when a crowd of 20,000 was on hand to see the club face The Original All Blacks, losing 28-0.  December 1909 saw Tigers play the Barbarians for the first time, holding them to a 9-9 draw.  The fixture became a vital feature in the club's calendar delivering large attendances until open professionalism and league rugby in the 1990s forced it to gradually be abandoned due to fixture congestion.  Tigers won the Midlands Counties Cup three more times in four years to cement their place as the midland's premier side before the outbreak of war in 1914.  The visit of the Invincible All Blacks on 4 October 1924 saw a record attendance at Welford Road of 35,000 that stands to this day.  Tigers were beaten 27-0 by the tourists.

Lions captains, decline and club restructure (1928–1971)

Club captain Doug Prentice captained the 1930 British Lions tour to New Zealand and Australia.  The first BBC radio broadcast of a Tigers game was against Waterloo on 29 November 1930; Tigers won 21-5.  Bernard Gadney became the club's first home-produced England captain in 1934 and was captain when four Leicester players were part of the first England side to beat the All Blacks. Gadney also became the club's second player to captain the British Lions on their tour to Argentina.  1936-37 was the worst season since 1889-90 for the club with only 14 wins from 39 matches.

Tigers first televised game by the BBC was on 3 February 1951 when they beat London Scottish 14-0 at the Richmond Athletic Ground.
The club underwent a significant restructure in the 1956/57 season.  The practice of being an "invitation" club featuring only a First XV  stopped and Tigers adopted a more traditional membership club based approach with multiple sides.  The "A XV" was to be re-introduced under the name "Extra First XV" with a third "Colts XV" also formed.  The 1963/64 season saw David Matthews set the record for most consecutive appearances for the club with 109.  Matthews was to become captain in 1965 and in 1966/67 lead the club to a record 33 wins.  Chalkie White became coach in 1968; the same season Tom Berry became Leicester's first President of the RFU. White was credited with revolutionising Leicester's players in response to rule changes that opened up the game.  1970/71 saw Peter Wheeler emerge as first-choice hooker having made his debut the year before, he ended the season on England's tour to the Far East.  Attendance for the annual Barbarians game hit a nadir with a crowd of only 2,518.

Introduction of competitions (1971–1978)

The 1971/72 season saw changes that would radically change both the club and the game.  The RFU introduced a national Knockout Cup competition for clubs and on 16 November 1971 Tigers played their first competitive cup match since 1914, a 10-3 defeat to Nottingham at their Beeston ground.  Also introduced that season was Tigers' first "Youth" XV, based on a collection of the best 14 and 15-year-olds in the county.  Only six years later Paul Dodge became the first graduate to win an international cap.

Tigers were not involved in the 1974-75 Cup and lost in the 1st round of the 1975-76 Cup.  This forced the club into the Midlands qualifiers for the only time.  This era saw a huge increase in the popularity of the Barbarians annual fixture with crowds of 15,000 in 1973 & 1975, 17,000 in 1974 and 21,000 in 1976.  This contrasted with usual crowds in the low hundreds.   1976-77 saw the introduction of regional "Merit Tables" by the RFU, the first step on the road to full leagues.  Based around traditional fixtures Tigers finished second to Moseley in the Midlands Merit Table with a record of played 8 won 6.  It took 6 years before Leicester were drawn at home in the cup but in 1977-78 they received four in a row on their way to a first Twickenham final against Gloucester.  The game ended in a 6-3 loss to the Cherry and Whites; the attendance was 25,282 - more than double the previous season.  Cup success also coincided with Tigers' membership more than doubling from 750 in 1978 to 2,000 by the end of 1979.

Centenary and cup and league success (1979–1988)

Leicester secured their first national trophy, the 1978–79 John Player Cup, by defeating Moseley 15–12. Tigers retained the cup in 1979–80 beating London Irish 21–9 at Twickenham in front of a record crowd of 27,000. 1979–80 also saw Tigers win the Midlands Merit Table for the first time. To celebrate the club's centenary a six-match tour to Australia and Fiji was arranged in August 1980, the first undertaken by an English club in the southern hemisphere. Prestige fixtures staged at Welford Road to mark the centenary were the visit of the Irish Wolfhounds, Romania, and Queensland. Tigers retained the Midlands Merit Table title in November with an undefeated record. On 25 April 1981 Tigers' Dusty Hare broke the world record for points scored in first-class fixtures with 3,658 points.  Leicester retained the cup in 1980–81 by beating Gosforth 22–15.

Leicester was knocked out in the semi-finals of the 1982 Cup. This was also Chalkie White's last season with the club after 30 years as a player, administrator or coach. A new generation of players debuted in the early '80s: Dean Richards, John Wells, and Rory Underwood. In 1985 in the penultimate step towards league rugby, the Merit Table A was launched for two seasons where Tigers finished fourth and second. League rugby was launched in England with the 1987–88 Courage League and all sides now played all other sides in a round-robin. Tigers lost only one match all season and the end of the 1987–88 season Tigers became England's first official champions.

Tigers finished the 1988–89 Courage League in sixth place, their joint-worst ever finish. During the late 1980s and early 1990s several key members of the Leicester pack came through the youth ranks and became key first-team contributors, most notably lock Martin Johnson who debuted in 1989 and later became club captain; flanker Neil Back who joined in 1990; and the front row trio of Graham Rowntree, Richard Cockerill, and Darren Garforth who started 166 games together between 1992 and 2002.

Professional and European success (1993–2003)
From 1993 to 2002 Leicester enjoyed a remarkable nine trophies in ten years. This streak started when Leicester won the 1993 Pilkington Cup. In 1993/94 Tigers finished runners up in the Courage League to Bath. Leicester finished as Courage League champion in 1994–95.

The advent of the 1995–96 season brought two important changes: rugby union (and consequently the Tigers) became professional, and European club competition began in the form of the Heineken cup. The 1995/96 season was another of just missing out to perennial rivals Bath who secured a league and cup double after defeating Leicester in the Pilkington Cup final. In Leicester's debut season in the Heineken Cup the team reached the final, losing 28-9 against Brive. Leicester won the 1997 Pilkington Cup Final 9–3 against Sale.  That summer Martin Johnson was named as captain for the 1997 British Lions tour to South Africa. In February 1998 Dean Richards was appointed as Director of Rugby following Bob Dwyer's sacking.

Under Richards, Leicester entered a golden age, winning four consecutive Premiership Rugby titles in 1999, 2000, 2001 and 2002, as well as back to back Heineken Cups in 2001 and 2002.
During the 1998–99 Premiership, the Tigers title was sealed in the penultimate match of the season. In the 1999-2000 Premiership season Leicester retained their title. Tigers' third successive Premiership title was sealed early on 17 March 2001.  In the 2001 Heineken Cup final Tigers beat Stade Français 34-30 to secure the club's first continental title. Tigers had won the inaugural Premiership playoffs the week before so also sealed an unprecedented treble.  That summer Martin Johnson was named captain for the 2001 British & Irish Lions tour to Australia, becoming the first man to lead two tours.

Leicester became the first side to retain a European title after beating Munster 15-9 in the 2002 Heineken Cup Final. Leicester also retained their fourth successive Premiership title in 2002. This brought the club's total to six championships, tying Bath's record. During this time Leicester went 57 games unbeaten at home from 30 December 1997 to 30 November 2002 and earned 52 successive wins.  During these four seasons, Leicester lost only 14 games out of the 92 they played.

During the 2003-04 season, Leicester's form suffered and with eight games left in the season Dean Richards was sacked.  After Richards' departure Tigers turned to his assistant coach John Wells,  who guided Leicester to the regular season top of the league in his only full season.  In Martin Johnson and Neil Back's last game for Leicester they lost the Premiership Final to London Wasps.

Premiership success (2004–2013)

Pat Howard succeeded Wells as the Head Coach. Howard coached the club for two seasons losing a Premiership final to Sale in his first season. Over the summer of 2006, the core of a new pack was recruited, and in Howard's second season Leicester won their first piece of silverware for five years, winning the Anglo-Welsh Cup, and sealed the club's first domestic league and cup double after winning the Premiership final 44–16 against Gloucester. However, Leicester lost the Heineken Cup Final to Wasps. Howard left the club at the end of the season.

Howard was succeeded for one season by the coach of  Marcelo Loffreda, who started after the 2007 Rugby World Cup.  Loffreda had a torrid time in charge despite getting to two finals. After losing the Anglo Welsh Cup final to the Ospreys, Leicester became the first side to win an away game in the Premiership playoffs by beating Gloucester in the semi-finals, but lost to Wasps in the final. After this final Loffreda was sacked.

Heyneke Meyer was the board's choice to replace Loffreda, but family circumstances led to his resignation. Richard Cockerill took over, the appointment was confirmed as permanent on 17 April 2009.  Cockerill lead Leicester to two Premiership titles in as many years. In the 2009 Premiership final Leicester beat London Irish 10–9, and Tigers retained their title the following year as they defeated Saracens 33–27.  After an historic placing kicking competition decided the 2009 Heineken cup semi-final, Leicester lost the 2009 Heineken Cup Final to Irish province Leinster.
On Friday 6 November 2009 Leicester hosted the world champion Springboks of South Africa and the young Leicester side triumphed 22–17.

Domestic success continued with Tigers reaching Premiership finals but losing in 2011 and 2012, against Saracens and Harlequins respectively, and winning the 2012 LV Cup.  In 2013 Tigers won their record extending 10th English title defeating local rivals Northampton Saints 37–17.

Championship drought (2013–2020)
The next year Northampton beat Tigers 21-20 in the Premiership semi final at Franklin's Gardens. The next two years Tigers suffered heavy away defeats in the semi finals to Bath (47-10) and Saracens (44-17).

On Monday 2 January 2017, Leicester sacked Richard Cockerill as Director of Rugby. Aaron Mauger was placed in temporary charge of the team, winning the 2017 Anglo-Welsh Cup, until Matt O'Connor was announced as the new head coach. Under O'Connor Tigers secured their 13th consecutive playoff appearance where they lost narrowly to Wasps 21-20. In the 2017-18 season successive home defeats to Northampton and Newcastle in Leicester's final two home games saw Tigers miss the playoffs for the first time since 2005. After a 40-6 defeat in the opening game of the 2018-19 Premiership Rugby season O'Connor was sacked by the club with immediate effect. Geordan Murphy was placed in charge of the side on an interim basis. Murphy was then made the permanent head coach on 18 December 2018 despite the team being on an eight match losing run.  Results did not improve and a final day defeat against Bath saw Leicester finish 11th in the Premiership, their worst ever finish.

After a delayed start to the season due to the 2019 Rugby World Cup Tigers fortunes did not improve, and on 21 January 2020 it was announced after months of speculation that England's forwards coach Steve Borthwick would join the club as head coach once his duties with England were finished.  His start was later confirmed as July 2020.

On 16 March 2020 the 2019-20 Premiership Rugby season was suspended for 5 weeks due to the COVID-19 pandemic in the United Kingdom, with group training suspended indefinitely on 23 March. After the cancellation of games the club implemented 25% wage cuts on all staff, including players, on 22 April 2020 it was reported that Tigers players were unhappy with this and had engaged a solicitor to represent them, though this was quickly denied, on 11 May 2020 CEO Simon Cohen left the club after an 8 year tenure and was replaced by Andrea Pinchen.  On 4 June 2020 it was revealed that Tigers were set to lose up to £5m of revenue during the coronavirus enforced shutdown, eventually making 31 employees redundant.  On 29 June it was reported that the pay dispute which started in April could result in several players leaving the club after refusing to cut their pay, with 5 players including Manu Tuilagi and Telusa Veainu leaving later that week after refusing to amend their contracts in light of the global pandemic.

The completion of the delayed 2019-20 Premiership Rugby season between August and October saw another 11th place finish for Leicester, saved from relegation only by a points deduction from Saracens for breaching the salary cap.  On 13 November 2020, just 8 days before the start of the 2020-21 Premiership Rugby season Geordan Murphy left as director of rugby in a decision described as "mutual".

Borthwick in charge (2020–2022)
With new head coach Steve Borthwick now in charge of team selection Leicester got off to a winning start against Gloucester.  In his first season at the club Borthwick guided Leicester to the 2020-21 European Rugby Challenge Cup final and 6th place in the league, securing Champions Cup rugby for the first time in two years.

Tigers started the following season strongly, five wins in the opening five rounds was the club's best start in the Premiership era, the club remained unbeaten for 15 games in all competitions, the second best start to a season ever, but failed to tie the record after losing to Wasps on 9 January 2022. A week later later Leicester overcame an 18 point deficit in the second half to beat Connacht, a Hosea Saumaki try sealing the win on the final play of the game, and secure progress to their first Champions Cup knock out stages since 2016.

In Europe, Leicester progressed past Clermont Auvergne over two legs, despite getting red cards in both matches, but lost at home to Leinster 23-14, after falling behind 20-0 in the first half to the Irish side.

Domestically they secured a first home play-off semi final since 2013, with two games to spare, after a 56-26 win against Bristol Bears.  Tigers' winger Chris Ashton broke the Premiership Rugby all-time try scoring record in this match, his hat-trick taking him to 95 career league tries.  In the semi-final they faced local rivals Northampton Saints, but much of the build up was focused on recently retired former captain Tom Youngs whose wife, Tiffany, passed away from cancer in week preceding the match. His brother Ben Youngs started the match, and it was his half back partner George Ford who inspired the victory scoring a "full house" with a try, conversion, penalty & drop goal for 22 points in a 27-13 win.

In the final Leicester faced Saracens, a re-match of the 2010 & 2011 finals. Ford wasn't to last long in the final withdrawing injured in the 23rd minute & being replaced by Freddie Burns. With the matching tied 12-12 it was Burns who scored the 80th minute drop goal to win Leicester their 11th English title, only two seasons after finishing in 11th place.

Speculation began that Borthwick was in line to succeed Eddie Jones as England head coach after the 2023 Rugby World Cup, but after a poor 2022 Autumn internationals Jones was replaced by Borthwick on 19 December 2022. He was initially replaced as Leicester head coach in an interim capacity by Richard Wigglesworth, the club's starting scrum half in the 2022 Premiership final & previous attack coach. On 22 February 2023, it was announced that Dan McKellar would take the role on a full time basis from 1 July 2023, previously having been 's forwards coach.

Women's team
Leicester Tigers formed a women's team on 15 July 2021, launched in partnership with Lichfield Ladies, in their initial season they played a season of friendlies before entering Women's Championship North 1 for the 2022-23 season, taking the place of Lichfield. The club confirmed it's intention to bid for a place in Premier 15s for the 2023-24 season, on 16 December 2022 the RFU announced that they had been successful and would join the Premier 15s.

On 5 November 2022 the local derby with Loughborough RFC saw a record crowd for a 2nd division game as 3,523 attended.

Season summary

* In 2001 & 2002 the winners of the league were considered champions with the winners of the playoffs considered champions from 2003 onward.

Premiership play-offs

Leicester have participated in 14 of the 20 Premiership Play Offs, reaching nine consecutive finals between 2005 and 2013.  Leicester finished first in 2004–05 going directly to the final; in Martin Johnson & Neil Back's last game for the club they lost 43–19 to Wasps.  The following season Tigers finished second beating London Irish 40–8 in their first Play Off semi final before losing the final 45-20 to Sale.

In 2007 Leicester won their first title via the playoffs. They defeated Bristol 26–14 in semi-final before beating Gloucester 44–16 at Twickenham. On 18 May 2008 Leicester defeated Gloucester at Kingsholm to become the first team to win a Premiership semi-final playoff away from home. Leicester lost the 2008 final 26-16 to Wasps.

In 2008–09 Tigers topped the table and beat Bath 24-10 in the semi final.  The final was the closest yet, Tigers winning 10-9 against London Irish. In 2010 the side retained the trophy winning 33–27 against Saracens, Dan Hipkiss scored the decisive try in the closing stages. Tigers reached the 2010–11 final for a rematch with Saracens losing 22-18.

2011–12 saw Tigers finish second in the table and beat Saracens 24-15 in the semi finals at Welford Road. In the 2012 final Harlequins beat Leicester 30-23.  In 2013 Leicester finished 2nd and beat Harlequins 33–16 in the semi final at Welford Road. Leicester won their tenth Premiership title by beating Northampton, 37–17.  These nine consecutive finals is a record for consecutive appearances in a Premiership play-off final.

In 2014 Leicester finished third and lost, 21-20, to Northampton in the semi final at Franklin's Gardens. In 2015 Leicester finished third and lost to Bath, 47-10, in the semi finals.  In 2016 Leicester finished fourth and traveled to Allianz Park where they lost to Saracens, 44-17.  In 2017 Leicester finished fourth and faced Wasps at the Ricoh Arena, losing 21-20.

After a four year spell of missing the play offs Leicester returned to the play offs in 2022 after finishing the regular season top.  In the semi-final they beat Northampton Saints 27-14. In the final they faced Saracens, Freddie Burns scored an 80th minute drop goal to win the final 15-12 and seal Leicester's 11th English Championship.

Honours

Leicester hold the record for most Premiership titles (11), the most consecutive Premiership Final appearances (9) and the most Play off appearances (14).  They were the first team to achieve an away semi-final victory in the Premiership play-offs (against Gloucester at Kingsholm on 18 May 2008).

1st XV
 Premiership Rugby
Champions (11): 1988, 1995, 1999, 2000, 2001, 2002, 2007, 2009, 2010, 2013, 2022
 Runners-up (7): 1994, 1996, 2005, 2006, 2008, 2011, 2012
European Cup
 Champions (2): 2001, 2002
Runners-up (3): 1997, 2007, 2009
RFU Knockout Cup
Champions (5): 1979, 1980, 1981, 1993, 1997
Runners-up (5): 1978, 1983, 1989, 1994, 1996
Anglo-Welsh Cup
Champions (3):  2007, 2012, 2017
 Runners-up (1): 2008
European Challenge Cup
 Runners-up (1): 2020-21
Midland Counties Cup
 Champions (12): 1897-98, 1898-99, 1899-1900, 1900-01, 1901-02, 1902-03, 1903-04, 1904-05, 1908-09, 1909-10, 1911-12, 1912-13
 Runners-up (3): 1888-89, 1890-91, 1893-94

Leicester A (Reserve team)
Leicestershire County Cup
 Champions (5) 1895, 1896, 1898, 1899, 1902
Premiership A League
 Champions (4) 2005, 2006, 2010, 2011
 Runners-up (1) 2007

Name and colours

Nickname

The club's formal name is Leicester Football Club but is widely known by the nickname "Tigers".  The first known use of the name was after a game against Bedford School in February 1885, the Leicester Daily Post reporting that "the Tiger stripes were keeping well together". The origin of the nickname is uncertain most probably coming from the side's chocolate and yellow playing kit, but it may have come from the club's links to the Leicestershire Regiment, who had received the nickname 'Tigers' after serving in India, and from 1825 had worn a cap-badge with a 'royal' tiger to mark the connection.

In their early years the side were also known as "The Death or Glory Boys" on account of their black shirts.

Player identification

In the 1926–27 season Leicester started using letters to identify their forwards; The Birmingham Post report for the match against Bath on 6 October 1926 noted "Leicester's forwards were picked out easily as their jerseys were decorated with large bold letters A-G".  On 12 September 1931 against Old Blues the practice was expanded to the whole team.

This tradition lasted until 1998 when Premiership Rugby rules forced Leicester to abandon lettering and Tigers first wore numbers on 5 September 1998 against Harlequins at Welford Road.

On the current kit the letters are displayed in small on the front of the jersey.

Colours

Tigers' very first kit was black with white shorts and black socks, with the club's crest in the centre of the chest. From 1884 to 1887, the club played in chocolate and yellow shirts, likely giving rise to the club's nickname, white shorts and black socks before experimenting with claret and French grey horizontal stripes between 1887 and 1891.

The first use of the scarlet, green and white was on 3 October 1891 against Wolverton at Belgrave Cricket & Cycle Ground. However, for the 1891–92 season, the pattern was vertical stripes. It was not until 1895 that the now-traditional scarlet, green and white horizontal stripes were introduced to the jersey, paired with black shorts and socks until 1906. The Tigers then played three season between 1906 and 1909 in white shirts with navy shorts, the first two seasons with a leaping tiger logo on the left breast before reverting to a scarlet, green and white striped jersey, while retaining the navy shorts. This new kit layout lasted until 1947 when the navy shorts were swapped for white.

The Tigers kit and colours did not materially change between 1947 and 1999, only slight variations in the sizes of the stripes, the addition of a manufacturer's logo in 1975, a sponsor in 1988 and in 1991 the addition of the club crest for the first time since 1908.

In 1999, the Tigers switched to a darker green and have played in a variety of kit designs since.

The Tigers' current kit was launched on 11 September 2019 and features Leicester's traditional green, red and white stripes. On 4 July 2016 it was announced that Holland and Barrett would be the main shirt sponsors, a deal that was extended on 12 August 2019; other sponsors are Breedon Aggregates who take a patch on the collarbone, Global Payments who take a box above the players' number, Mattioli Woods who take the back of the shirt above the player's name and Stihl who take a patch on the sleeve; LeoVegas take a patch on the shorts.

Summary of kit manufacturers and sponsors

Stadium

The club plays its home games at Mattioli Wood Welford Road.  The ground was opened in 1892 and the first stands accommodated 3,000 spectators.  The clubhouse was built on the Aylestone Road end in 1909, the Members' & Crumbie Stands were built just before and just after the First World War respectively. A stand was built at the Welford Road end in 1995, initially called the Alliance & Leicester Stand it is currently known as the Mattioli Woods Stand. The total ground capacity is currently 25,849 after redevelopments in 2008 and 2015.

Before redevelopment of Welford Road began in 2008 the club explored other options.  On 23 November 2004 the club announced that it had entered into a 50–50 joint venture with the city's main football club, Leicester City, to purchase City's current ground, Leicester City Stadium. If the purchase had gone through, the Tigers would have surrendered their lease on Welford Road and moved into Walkers Stadium. However, after several months of talks, the two clubs ended any ground share plans in July 2005.

On 11 June 2007 the club announced plans that it was working for a redevelopment plan which would raise the capacity from 17,498 to 25,000 by 2011.  On 20 February 2008 Leicester Tigers received planning consent for the £60million redevelopment of Welford Road.  The first phase of the development was a new 10,000 seat North Stand (Granby Halls side), taking overall capacity from 17,498 to 24,000.  In the summer of 2008 work began on the construction of the new North Stand.  The work was completed for the first home game of the 2009-10 season against Newcastle Falcons.

At the end of the 2008–09 season three home games were played at the King Power Stadium, then known as the Walkers Stadium, due to demolition of the old north stand.  These saw Tigers play Bath twice, a 20-15 win in the Heineken Cup quarter finals and a victory in the Premiership Play Off semi finals as well as a 73–3 win against Bristol.  Tigers have also played two Heineken Cup Semi Final games at the King Power Stadium, against Toulose and Llanelli Scarlets in 2005 and 2007 respectively, but the ground was designated as a neutral venue for both.

On 27 February 2015 Tigers announced plans to continue the redevelopment of Welford Road by replacing the clubhouse and temporary West Stand with a new permanent building with a 3,100 capacity.  Work started on 28 May 2015 and was completed by January 2016.

In October 2020, Mattioli Woods extended their naming rights deal to include the entire stadium for 5 seasons until 2024–25. The stadium became Mattioli Woods Welford Road.

Current squad

Senior squad

The Leicester Tigers senior squad for the 2022–23 season is:

Development squad

Leicester Tigers' development squad is:

Notable former players

Record appearances and scorers

David Matthews holds the record for most appearances for Leicester Tigers with 502 appearances between 1955 and 1974.  Percy Lawrie is the only man to score more than 200 tries for the club, scoring a record 206 between 1907 and 1927.  Dusty Hare is the club's all-time highest points scorer with 4,507 between 1976 and 1989.

Internationals

171 players from 15 different nations have been selected to represent their national side whilst a member of Leicester.  The first was Jack Miles who was selected for England in 1903, Leicester's first non-English international was Scotland's Jock Lawrie in 1924.  The club's first non-British or Irish player selected for international duty was Canada's Dave Lougheed when he played against USA in August 1998.

Lions Tourists
The following are players who have represented the Lions while playing for Leicester:

3 tours:

 Martin Johnson (1993, 1997, 2001)
 Neil Back (1997, 2001, 2005)

2 tours:

 Dan Cole (2013, 2017)
 Tom Croft (2009, 2013)
 Martin Corry (2001, 2005)
 Graham Rowntree (1997, 2005)
 Austin Healey (1997, 2001)
 Dean Richards (1989, 1993)
 Rory Underwood (1989, 1993)
 Clive Woodward (1980, 1983)
 Peter Wheeler (1977, 1980)

1 tour

Italics denote a player who appeared on another tour whilst a member of another club.

2013: Ben Youngs†, Tom Youngs, Manu Tuilagi, Geoff Parling
2009: Harry Ellis
2005: Julian White, Ben Kay, Lewis Moody, Geordan Murphy, Ollie Smith
2001: Dorian West
1997: Will Greenwood, Eric Miller
1993: Tony Underwood
1983: Dusty Hare
1980: Paul Dodge
1974: Alan Old
1971: Rodger Arneil
1959: Tony O'Reilly, Phil Horrocks-Taylor
1936: Bernard Gadney, Alexander Obolensky, Charles Beamish
1930: Doug Prentice, George Beamish, Joe Kendrew
1910: Ken Wood
1908: F.S. Jackson, John Jackett, Tom Smith
1903: Alfred Hind

†Ben Youngs was selected to tour for a second time in 2017, but turned down the offer for family reasons.

Rugby World Cup
The following are players which have represented their countries at the Rugby World Cup, whilst playing for Leicester:

International captains
Source:

 Wavell Wakefield (England, 1924, 4 tests)
 Doug Prentice (Lions, 1930, 2 tests)
 George Beamish (Ireland, 1932, 4 tests)
 Bernard Gadney (England, 1934–36, 8 tests; Lions, 1936, 1 test)
 Douglas Kendrew (England, 1935, 2 tests)
 Peter Wheeler (England, 1983–84, 5 tests)
 Paul Dodge (England, 1985, 7 tests)
 Martin Johnson (England, 1998–2003, 39 tests; Lions, 1997 & 2001, 6 tests)
 Neil Back (England, 2001, 4 tests)
 Dorian West (England, 2003, 1 test)
 Martin Corry (England, 2005–07, 17 tests)
 Lewis Moody (England, 2010, 3 tests)
 Martin Castrogiovanni (Italy, 2012, 3 tests)
 Leonardo Ghiraldini (Italy, 2015, 4 tests)
 George Ford (England, 2017–19, 1 test as co-captain, 4 tests as captain)
 Julián Montoya (Argentina, 2021–2022, 10 tests)

* Martin Corry was also captain for the majority of a Lions test in 2005 after Brian O'Driscoll left the field injured, however he is not considered the official captain for that match.

Captains
The following have been appointed club captain:

 B.V.D. Zweth
 A. E. Brice
 A.T. Porter
 L. Young
 J.G.S. Coleman
 W.A. Sheffield
 J. Parsons
 R.S. Snowden
 W.R. Porter
 A. McKechnie
 W.H. Sturges
 A.E. Cooke
 E. Redman
 A.O. Jones
 W.J Foreman
 J.W. Garner
 S. Matthews
 R.F. Russell
 J.R Watson
 P.W. Lawrie
 W.J. Allen
 W.W. Wakefield
 H.L.V. Day
 F.D. Prentice
 H.D. Greenless
 D.J. Norman
 R.A. Buckingham
 B.C. Gadney
 R.J. Barr
 J.T.W. Berry
 H.P. Jerwood
 A.C. Towell
 D. Goves
 W.K.T. Moore
 A.D. Bolesworth
 J.M. Jenkins
 J. Elders
 T. Bleasdale
 J.S. Swan
 C.G. Martin
 M.R. Wade
 M.J. Harrison
 D.J. Matthews
 G.G. Willars
 K.P. Andrews
 J. Allen
 R.V. Grove
 P.J. Wheeler
 R.S. Money
 R.E. Rowell
 B.P. Hall
 S. Johnson
 I.R. Smith
 L. Cusworth
 P.W. Dodge
 J.M. Wells
 D. Richards
 M.O. Johnson
 N.A. Back
 J.A. Kronfeld
 M.E. Corry
 G.E.A. Murphy
 T.G.A.L. Flood
 E.N. Slater
 T.N. Youngs
 E. Genge
 H. Liebenberg

World Rugby Hall of Fame
The following people associated with club have been inducted into the World Rugby Hall of Fame.

 Tony O'Reilly - Inducted in 2009
 Martin Johnson - Inducted in 2011
 Clive Woodward - Inducted in 2011
 Bob Dwyer - Inducted in 2011
 Waisale Serevi - Inducted in 2013
 Wavell Wakefield - Inducted in 2015

Team of the Century and Walk of Legends
Tigers have named two "best" teams in recent times.  On 1 November 2000 to celebrate the coming millennium a panel of former Tigers players and administrators named a Team of the century; whilst from October 2008 to February 2009 to celebrate the building of the then named Caterpillar Stand fans were invited to vote on a Walk of Legends in partnership with the Leicester Mercury.

At the time the Team of the Century was announced Garforth, Johnson and Back were still current players.

Coaches

Current coaches
Source:

-  Dan McKellar, Head Coach, on a long-term deal, commencing from July 1, 2023.
  Richard Wigglesworth, Interim head coach
  Aled Walters, Head of physical performance
  Brett Deacon, Assistant coach
  Matt Smith, Assistant coach
  Tom Harrison, Scrum coach
  Matt Everard, assistant coach

Past coaches

Sources

References

External links

 
 Fansite
 Leicester Tigers Podcasts
 Welford Road Stadium Information & Gallery
 Premiership Page

 
Premiership Rugby teams
English rugby union teams
Rugby clubs established in 1880
1880 establishments in England
Sport in Leicester
Heineken Cup champions